The 1983 Korean Super League was the first ever season of the K League, the top football league in South Korea. A total of five teams participated in the league. Two of them were professional teams (Hallelujah FC and Yukong Elephants), and three of them were semi-professional teams (POSCO Dolphins, Daewoo Royals and Kookmin Bank). Each founding member had its mascot: eagle, elephant, dolphin, royal (crown) and magpie.

The season began on 8 May and ended on 25 September. It was played in two stages: the first stage was held in five cities (Seoul, Busan, Daegu, Jeonju, and Daejeon), and the second stage was held in nine cities (including Gwangju, Chuncheon, Masan, and Andong).

League table

Positions by matchday

Results

Top scorers

Awards

Main awards

Source:

Best XI

Source:

References

External links
 RSSSF

K League seasons
1
South Korea
South Korea